Nitya Shetty is an Indian  actress appearing in Telugu and Tamil films. She won two Nandi Awards.

Career
Nitya Shetty worked as a child actress in Telugu films during the early 2000s appearing in films including Devullu (2000), while winning the Nandi Award for Best Child Actress for her roles in Chinni Chinni Aasha (1998) and Little Hearts (2000). After about 20 films as a child artiste, she took a break from films to complete her education. She graduated in Electronics and Communication Engineering from Institute of Aeronautical Engineering, 
Dundigal later campus placed and joined Infosys as a software engineer.

However she wanted to continue work as an actress and successfully auditioned to be a part of the Telugu film, Padesave, before working on the family drama, Dagudumootha Dandakor (2015).

She has consequently featured in low budget Tamil films including Jayaprakash's Aivarattam (2015) and Kadhal Kaalam (2016). She recently worked in the Telugu film Nuvvu Thopu Raa (2019) and Tamil film "Aghavan"(2019).

Filmography

WEB SERIES :

2022 : Hello World (web series) : ZEE5 : Pravalika Jaladhanki

References

External links
 

Living people
Actresses in Tamil cinema
Actresses in Telugu cinema
21st-century Indian actresses
Indian film actresses
Year of birth missing (living people)
Child actresses in Telugu cinema
Actresses from Bangalore
20th-century Indian actresses